Richard Abberbury (died 1416) was an English politician who was MP for Berkshire in 1394 and January 1397. He was chamberlain to John of Gaunt. He was the son of Richard Abberbury the Elder.

References

English MPs 1394
English MPs January 1397
Members of the Parliament of England for Berkshire
14th-century births
1416 deaths